Southern Mindanao Colleges also referred to by the acronym SMC, is a non-sectarian private college located at Pagadian, Zamboanga del Sur, Philippines. In terms of student population, SMC has the highest number of students.

Campuses
SMC Annex
SMC Main
SMC Engineering Building
SMC Administration Building

See also
City Commercial Center
List of universities and colleges in the Philippines

References

External links
mypagadian.com
pagadian.org

Schools in Pagadian
Universities and colleges in Zamboanga del Sur